The 1925 SMU Mustangs football team was an American football team that represented Southern Methodist University (SMU) as a member of the Southwest Conference (SWC) during the 1925 college football season. In its sixth season under head coach Ray Morrison, the team compiled a 5–2–2 record (1–1–2 against SWC opponents), finished fourth in the conference, and outscored opponents by a total of 148 to 41. James Magness was the team captain. The team played its home games at Fair Park Stadium in Dallas.

Schedule

References

SMU
SMU Mustangs football seasons
SMU Mustangs football